Nunc A/S of Denmark was founded in 1953. Nunc specialized in laboratory plastic ware including products for cell culture, cell biology assays, sample prep, and sample storage. The company merged with the Nalge Company, which was founded in 1949 by chemist Emanuel Goldberg of Rochester, New York in 1995.

References

Manufacturing companies of Denmark
Companies based in Roskilde Municipality
Danish companies established in 1949